In anthropology and geography, a cultural region, cultural sphere, cultural area or culture area refers to a geography with one relatively homogeneous human activity or complex of activities (culture). Such activities are often associated with an ethnolinguistic group and with the territory it inhabits. Specific cultures often do not limit their geographic coverage to the borders of a nation state, or to smaller subdivisions of a state.

Cultural "spheres of influence" may also overlap or form concentric structures of macrocultures encompassing smaller local cultures. Different boundaries may also be drawn depending on the particular aspect of interest, such as religion and folklore vs. dress and architecture vs. language.

History of concept

A culture area is a concept in cultural anthropology in which a geographic region and time sequence (age area) is characterized by substantially uniform environment and culture. The concept of culture areas was originated by museum curators and ethnologists during the late 1800s as means of arranging exhibits. Clark Wissler and Alfred Kroeber further developed the concept on the premise that they represent longstanding cultural divisions. The concept is criticized by some who argue that the basis for classification is arbitrary. But other researchers disagree and the organization of human communities into cultural areas remains a common practice throughout the social sciences. The definition of culture areas is enjoying a resurgence of practical and theoretical interest as social scientists conduct more research on processes of cultural globalization.

Types
Allen Noble gave a summary of the concept development of cultural regions using the terms "cultural hearth" (no origin of this term given), "cultural core" by Donald W. Meinig for Mormon culture published in 1970 and "source area" by Fred Kniffen (1965) and later Henry Glassie (1968) for house and barn types. Outside of a core area he quoted Meinigs' use of the terms "domain" (a dominant area) and "sphere" (area influenced but not dominant).

Cultural boundary

A  cultural boundary (also cultural border) in ethnology is a geographical boundary between two identifiable ethnic or ethnolinguistic cultures. A language border is necessarily also a cultural border, as language is a significant part of a society's culture), but it can also divide subgroups of the same ethnolinguistic group along more subtle criteria, such as the Brünig-Napf-Reuss line in German-speaking Switzerland, the Weißwurstäquator in Germany or the Grote rivieren boundary between Dutch and Flemish culture.

In the history of Europe, the major cultural boundaries are found:
in Western Europe between Latin Europe, where the legacy of the Roman Empire remained dominant, and Germanic Europe, where it was significantly syncretized with Germanic culture
in the Balkans, the Jireček Line, dividing the area of dominant Latin (Western Roman Empire) from that of dominant Greek (Eastern Roman Empire) influence.

Macro-cultures on a continental scale are also referred to as "worlds", "spheres", or "civilizations", such as the Muslim world.

In a modern context, a cultural boundary can also be a division between subcultures or classes within a given society, such as blue collar vs. white collar etc.

Examples
East–West dichotomy: the Western civilization and Western world contrasting with the Orient and Eastern world.
Global North and Global South: the North–South divide is broadly considered a socio-economic and political divide.

Geographic
Americas [see also Americas (terminology)]
Caribbean
Central America
Mesoamerica
North America
Northern America
South America
British Isles
Eastern world
Far East
Middle East
Near East
Indian subcontinent
Maghreb
Southeast Asia
Mainland Southeast Asia and Indochina
Maritime Southeast Asia
Turkestan

Based on language or language families:
Arab world, Arab-speaking world, and Arab diaspora
Celts and Celtic Europe
English-speaking world (Anglophone)
Baltic Finns
Francophonie (see also Françafrique)
German language in Europe
Germanic-speaking Europe
Hindi Belt (Hindi-Urdu Region)
Hispanidad
Hispanophone
Indigenous peoples of the Americas
Indigenous peoples of South America
Indigenous peoples of the Pacific Northwest Coast
Native Americans in the United States
Latin America
French America
Hispanic America
Ibero-America
Lusophone
Mainland Southeast Asia linguistic area
Latin Europe
Sinophone
Slavic Europe
Russian world

Based on cultures
Anglosphere
Arab world
Cévennes
East Asian cultural sphere (Sinosphere)
Greater China
Greater India and Indosphere
Greater Iran (Greater Persia)
Greater Middle East
Lusophone
Nordic countries (speaking North Germanic languages)
Russian world

Based on religious beliefs
Buddhism by country
Christendom (Christian world)
Christianity by country
Hinduism by country
Islamic state
Islamic republic
Islamic monarchy
Muslim world
Islam by country

Music
A music area is a cultural area defined according to musical activity. It may or may not conflict with the cultural areas assigned to a given region. The world may be divided into three large music areas, each containing a "cultivated" or classical musics "that are obviously its most complex musical forms", with, nearby, folk styles which interact with the cultivated, and, on the perimeter, primitive styles:
Europe and Sub-Saharan Africa
based on shared isometric materials, diatonic scales, and polyphony based on parallel thirds, fourths, and fifths. 
would usually use the natural major scale and minor scale, and Dorian, Lydian and Mixolydian modes.
North Africa, Southwest Asia, Central Asia, South Asia, Indonesia and parts of Southern Europe.
based on shared small intervals in scales, melodies, and polyphony.
would usually use the harmonic minor scale and the Phrygian scale.
American Indian, East Asia, Horn of Africa, Northern Siberian, and Finno-Ugric music
based on shared large steps in pentatonic and tetratonic scales.

However, he then adds that "the world-wide development of music must have been a unified process in which all peoples participated" and that one finds similar tunes and traits in puzzlingly isolated or separated locations throughout the world.

See also 
 Cultural landscape
 Cultural geography
 Social space
 Classification of indigenous peoples of the Americas
 List of music areas in the United States
 Sprachbund
 Julian Steward
 Regionalism (politics)
 Bioregionalism
 Culture
 Deep map
 Cultural tourism
 Continent
 World language
 Inglehart–Welzel cultural map of the world

References

Further reading
Philip V. Bohlman, Marcello Sorce Keller, and Loris Azzaroni (eds.), Musical Anthropology of the Mediterranean: Interpretation, Performance, Identity, Bologna, Edizioni Clueb – Cooperativa Libraria Universitaria Editrice, 2009.
Marcello Sorce Keller, “Gebiete, Schichten und Klanglandschaften in den Alpen. Zum Gebrauch einiger historischer Begriffe aus der Musikethnologie”, in T. Nussbaumer (ed.), Volksmusik in den Alpen: Interkulturelle Horizonte und Crossovers, Zalzburg, Verlag Mueller-Speiser, 2006, pp. 9–18

External links

Cultural anthropology
Cultural geography